Khonj Free Islamic University ( – Dāneshegāh-e Āzād Eslāmī-ye Khonj) is a village and university in Seyfabad Rural District, in the Central District of Khonj County, Fars Province, Iran. At the 2006 census, its population was 18, in 4 families.

References 

Populated places in Khonj County
Islamic universities and colleges in Iran